Janče is a village in the municipality of Mavrovo and Rostuša, North Macedonia.

Demographics
Janče has traditionally been inhabited by Orthodox Macedonians and a Muslim Macedonians (Torbeš) population.

According to the 2002 census, the village had a total of 146 inhabitants. Ethnic groups in the village include:

Macedonians 111
Turks 33
Albanians 2

References

External links

Villages in Mavrovo and Rostuša Municipality
Macedonian Muslim villages